Both local and Russian beer can be found in Kazakhstan. Large breweries are owned by international groups Efes Beverage Group (in cities Karaganda and Almaty) and Carlsberg Group (Almaty city) as well as by a private company Shymkentpivo (Shymkent city). In 2008, beer production in Kazakhstan fell by 12% to 3.60 mln hl, whereas the official import grew by 1% to 1.30 mln hl.

In 2008, each third bottle of beer sold in Kazakhstan was delivered from Russia. The main importer is Baltika Breweries of Carlsberg Group, for which Kazakhstan is still the major foreign business.

Major Kazakh beers 

Karagandinskoye - Efes-Karaganda, Efes Beverage Group, Kazakhstan

Derbes - Derbes company, Carlsberg Group, Kazakhstan

Shymkentskoye - Shymkentpivo Ltd., Kazakhstan

See also

 Beer and breweries by region

References

External links
The Official Website of Derbes company
Kazakhstan Republic: a low start. Journal.Beer 3'2008

Kazakhstan
Economy of Kazakhstan
Kazakh alcoholic drinks